Locke Morford Olson (December 10, 1926August 20, 2008) was an American basketball player. He competed as part of the gold medal-winning American team at the 1955 Pan American Games in Mexico City.

Early life and education
Olson was born on December 10, 1926. He attended Pomona College and played basketball for the Pomona-Pitzer Sagehens, where he became the first 1000-point scorer in the team's history.

References

1926 births
2008 deaths
American men's basketball players
Basketball players at the 1955 Pan American Games
Basketball players from California
Centers (basketball)
Olympic gold medalists for the United States in basketball
Pan American Games gold medalists for the United States
Pan American Games medalists in basketball
Pomona College alumni
Pomona-Pitzer Sagehens men's basketball players
United States men's national basketball team players
Medalists at the 1955 Pan American Games